Prayz Network is a network of Christian radio stations serving western Wisconsin, including the La Crosse and Eau Claire areas.

The Prayz Network airs a format consisting of contemporary Christian music as well as variety of Christian talk and teaching programs including; Truth for Life with Alistair Begg, and Turning Point with David Jeremiah.

Stations
The Prayz Network's flagship station is WTPN in Westby, Wisconsin. The Prayz Network is also heard on WEQS 89.3 in Sparta, Wisconsin, WWJC 101.5 in Augusta, Wisconsin, and WGSL 104.9 in La Crosse, Wisconsin.

References

External links
The Prayz Network's official website
The Prayz Network's webcast

Christian radio stations in the United States
American radio networks